Abdülhamit Yıldız (born 7 June 1987) is a Turkish footballer. He previously played for Dutch side FC Volendam.

References

Balıkesirspor'da Eren ve Abdülhamit'le yollar ayrıldı‚ haberturk.com, 1 January 2016

External links
 

1987 births
Sportspeople from Diyarbakır
Living people
Turkish footballers
Association football midfielders
Association football defenders
HVV Hollandia players
FC Volendam players
Gençlerbirliği S.K. footballers
Hacettepe S.K. footballers
Kasımpaşa S.K. footballers
Şanlıurfaspor footballers
Balıkesirspor footballers
Karşıyaka S.K. footballers
Fatih Karagümrük S.K. footballers
Altay S.K. footballers
Eredivisie players
Eerste Divisie players
Süper Lig players
TFF First League players
TFF Second League players
Turkish expatriate footballers
Expatriate footballers in the Netherlands
Turkish expatriate sportspeople in the Netherlands